Maroš Balko (born 16 September 1995) is a Slovak football player who plays as a midfielder for UFC Tadten in Austria.

Club career

FK Dukla Banská Bystrica
He made his professional debut for FK Dukla Banská Bystrica against FK AS Trenčín on 31 May 2014.

References

External links
 
 FK Dukla Banská Bystrica profile
 Eurofotbal profile

1995 births
Living people
Slovak footballers
Association football midfielders
FK Dukla Banská Bystrica players
MFK Lokomotíva Zvolen players
Slovak Super Liga players